Zuborev is a Russian surname. Notable people with the surname include:

Leonid Zuborev (born 1943), Soviet author
Sergei Zuborev (born 1983), Russian ice hockey player

See also
Zubarev

Russian-language surnames
Surnames of Russian origin